Silene calabra is a species of flowering plant in the family Caryophyllaceae. It is native to Italy.

References 

calabra
Flora of Italy